A list of films produced by the Marathi language film industry based in Maharashtra in the year 1948.

1948 Releases
A list of Marathi films released in 1948.

References

External links
Gomolo - 

Lists of 1948 films by country or language
1948
1948 in Indian cinema